Pontodryas is a genus of moths belonging to the family Tineidae.

This genus contains only one species, Pontodryas loxosema Meyrick, 1920 from Fiji.

References

Tineidae
Tineidae genera
Monotypic moth genera